The 2009 Polish Super Cup was held on 27 July 2009 between the 2008–09 Ekstraklasa winners Wisła Kraków and the 2008–09 Polish Cup winners Lech Poznań. Lech Poznań won the match on penalties after the match finished 1–1, winning the trophy for the fourth time in their history.

Match details

See also
2008–09 Ekstraklasa
2008–09 Polish Cup

References

SuperCup
Polish Super Cup
Polish Super Cup 2009